Pseudamiops is a genus of cardinalfishes native to the Pacific and Indian oceans.

Species
There are currently 5 recognized species in this genus:
 Pseudamiops diaphanes J. E. Randall, 1998 (Transparent cardinalfish)
 Pseudamiops gracilicauda (Lachner, 1953) (Graceful-tailed cardinalfish)
 Pseudamiops pellucidus J. L. B. Smith, 1954 (Limpid cardinalfish)
 Pseudamiops phasma J. E. Randall, 2001
 Pseudamiops springeri Gon & Bogorodsky, 2013

References

Pseudaminae
Marine fish genera
Taxa named by J. L. B. Smith